Rolando Emilio Escobar Batista (born 24 October 1981) is a football midfielder who currently plays for Mineros de Guayana of the Venezuelan Primera División.

Club career
A much-travelled midfielder, he has played for several teams in his native Panama as well for 4 different clubs in Venezuela. He won a league title with Deportivo Táchira, then moved to Caracas and played for Deportivo Lara and Deportivo Anzoátegui.

In May 2015, Escobar joined compatriot Blas Pérez at Major League Soccer outfit FC Dallas. Escobar was released in January 2016.

International career
Escobar made his debut for Panama in an August 2003 friendly match against Bolivia and has, as of 10 June 2015, earned a total of 40 caps, scoring 1 goal. He represented his country in 5 FIFA World Cup qualification matches and played at the 2007, 2009 and 2013 CONCACAF Gold Cups.

International goals

Scores and results list Panama's goal tally first.

Honors

Club
Liga Panameña de Fútbol (1):
2007 (A)
Primera División Venezolana (2):
2007–08
2008–09
 Copa Venezuela (1):
2017

References

External links
Player profile on possofutbol.com

http://www.futbolextremo.com/?psearch=rolando+escobar&cate=12
http://www.futbolextremo.com/foro/viewtopic.php?t=49378&highlight=rolando+escobar

1981 births
Living people
Sportspeople from Panama City
Association football midfielders
Panamanian footballers
Panama international footballers
2007 UNCAF Nations Cup players
2007 CONCACAF Gold Cup players
2009 CONCACAF Gold Cup players
2013 CONCACAF Gold Cup players
2014 Copa Centroamericana players
Unión Deportivo Universitario players
Tauro F.C. players
Deportivo Táchira F.C. players
Caracas FC players
San Francisco F.C. players
Asociación Civil Deportivo Lara players
Sporting San Miguelito players
Deportivo Anzoátegui players
FC Dallas players
Panamanian expatriate footballers
Expatriate footballers in Venezuela
Expatriate soccer players in the United States
Major League Soccer players